Minor Alpízar Campos (born 27 September 1953) is a former Costa Rican footballer.

Club career
Alpízar played for Ramonense in the Primera Division de Costa Rica and won the 1981 league title with Herediano.

International career
Alpízar made several appearances for the Costa Rica national football team, and was part of squads that played at the 1980 and 1984 Olympic Games held in Los Angeles.

References

1953 births
Living people
Costa Rican footballers
Costa Rica international footballers
Olympic footballers of Costa Rica
Footballers at the 1980 Summer Olympics
Footballers at the 1984 Summer Olympics
A.D. Ramonense players
C.S. Herediano footballers

Association football defenders